Jonathan Ian McLaren is a Canadian actor. He was nominated for the British Academy Games Award for Performer in a Leading Role at the 18th British Academy Games Awards for his work as Star-Lord in Marvel's Guardians of the Galaxy.

Filmography

Film

Television

Video games

References

External links

Jon McLaren Official Website

Living people
Canadian male film actors
Canadian male television actors
21st-century Canadian male actors
Year of birth missing (living people)